Jülide Gülizar (née Göksan; 1929 – 14 March 2011) was a Turkish anchorwoman and journalist. She was one of Turkey's first television anchors, as well as the first anchorwomen on the Turkish Radio and Television Corporation (TRT).

Gülizar was born in Adana, Turkey, in 1929. She graduated from Ankara University, Law School. 

Gülizar began her broadcasting career on TRT radio in Ankara, Turkey, in 1956. She went on to become the first anchorwoman to appear on television for TRT. She was a strong proponent of the use of standard Turkish in radio and television. She retired from TRT in 1982, but continued to work as a news presenter and teacher at other media organizations. Gülizar continued to produce and host her own television program until shortly before her death. She was also the author of several books, including Life, Thank You, One Subject, One Guest, Radios of Turkey Calling, and Where are you going Türkçe. 

Jülide Gülizar died from pneumonia at Hacettepe University Medical Faculty Hospital in Ankara, Turkey, on 14 March 2011, at the age of 82. Following the religious funeral service at Kocatepe Mosque, she was laid to rest at the Karşıyaka Cemetery.

References

Date of birth missing
1929 births
2011 deaths
Turkish television journalists
Turkish women journalists
Turkish women writers
Ankara University Faculty of Law alumni
People from Ankara
Turkish broadcast news analysts
Burials at Karşıyaka Cemetery, Ankara
Deaths from pneumonia in Turkey